FC Afips Afipsky was a Russian football team based in Afipsky. It was founded in 2012. In 2014–15 season, it advanced to the professional level, the third-tier Russian Professional Football League.

On 18 June 2018 it was announced that FC Afips is dissolved because of financial problems.

References

External links
  Official site

Association football clubs established in 2012
Sport in Krasnodar Krai
2012 establishments in Russia
Defunct football clubs in Russia
Association football clubs disestablished in 2018
2018 disestablishments in Russia